The Magna Charta Universitatum (Great Charter of Universities) is a short two-page document signed in Bologna, Italy in 1988 explicitly defining key principles underpinning the existence of universities such as academic freedom and institutional autonomy. The document is signed by higher education institutions with the aim to recognize and celebrate university traditions and to encourage cooperation among European universities. The document is intended to serve as a universal inspiration and is as such open to universities throughout the world and not only those located in Europe.

The charter was established by the University of Bologna and the European Rectors' Conference (now EUA) in 1988, to mark the 900th anniversary of the University of Bologna, with 388 original signatories.  it has been signed by 889 universities from 88 countries.

History
The Magna Charta Universitatum Europaeum was formally signed by 388 university rectors on 18 September 18 1988 at Piazza Maggiore in Bologna, to commemorate the 900th anniversary of the founding of the University of Bologna. The final text of the document was drafted in January 1988 in Barcelona. 

The Observatory Magna Charta Universitatum was established in 1998 and incorporated in 2000. It organised the first convention in 2001. 73 universities signed the charter at the annual convention on 18 September 2018, bringing the total to 889, with 13 more having been accepted in 2019.

See also
 European University Association
 Bologna declaration
 Memorandum of understanding

References

External links
Document text
Observatory Magna Charta Universitatum

Educational policies and initiatives of the European Union
1988 works